Illegal construction (also known as illegal building or illegal housing) is construction work (or the result of such) without a valid construction permit. Besides the potential technical hazards on uncontrolled construction sites and in finished buildings, illegal building activity can be a major environmental violation when the works encroach upon preserve areas like nature reserves. Likewise, illegal building can have serious political implications when it is practiced as landgrabbing or for illegal settling in foreign territories (see e.g. International law and Israeli settlements).

Illegal building can be the consequence of a combination of urbanization, overpopulation, homelessness and poverty in which case expanding slums, Shanty towns or similar will result. On the other hand, illegal building activity may be due to profitable speculation with and exploitation of valuable real property. Demand for mass tourism accommodation (hotels, etc.) as well as its counterpart, individualistic luxury retreats for the very rich are visible drivers of such speculation. Similar motivation may come from incentives connected with the illegal construction of great shopping malls or similar on greenfield land.

Even construction works with apparently valid permits can be a result of bribery.

In some cases it can be observed that legal or tolerated settlements are later declared illegal by governmental institutions in order to make room for more lucrative investments or simply for political demonstration purposes (see e.g. Operation Murambatsvina) sometimes under the pretext of beautification.

Notable examples
An infamous example of organized illegal construction can be found in the so-called Sack of Palermo.

Environmental risks
Increased landslide risk has been found to be associated with illegal building in hillside regions of densely populated urban areas in Italy and Bosnia and Herzegovina, because of loss of stabilizing vegetation by deforestation, etc.. Due to uncontrolled increase in impervious surface, the role of illegal construction has also been discussed in connection with flash floods (see 2011 European floods#Italy).

Detection
In addition to human observation, large-scale screening for illegal building (activity) can also rely on remote sensing technology using satellite imagery (e.g. from EROS B, IRS-P5,...) and geospatial information systems.

References

http://www.jcpa.org/jl/vp498.htm

See also

Favela
Gecekondu
Housing#Informal housing
Urban sprawl
:Category:Illegal housing
Illegal housing in India
Structural encroachment
Accumulation by dispossession
Lost, mislaid, and abandoned property
Building boom
Real estate boom
Illegal logging
Illegal mining
Sand mining

Environmental crime
Construction safety
Human habitats
Illegal housing
History of construction
Illegal occupations
Organized crime activity